Let's Get Free is the debut studio album by hip-hop duo dead prez. It was released February 8, 2000 on Loud Records.

Critical reception 
Although the production was derided by some critics as a "dull musical backdrop", Let's Get Free was called a "return to politically conscious rap". Rolling Stone gave the album four stars and lauded its equation of "classrooms with jail cells, the projects with killing fields and everything from water to television with conduits for brainwashing by the system".

Track listing

Album singles

Personnel
stic.man – lead vocals, production, executive producer, art direction
M-1 – lead vocals, production, executive producer, art direction
Hedrush – production, drum programming
Lord Jamar – production
Kanye West – production
Tahir (of Hedrush) – vocals
Maintain (of Illegal Tendencies) – vocals
Indo (of People's Army) – additional vocals
Abu (of People's Army) – additional vocals
Keanna Henson – additional vocals
Ness (of A-Alikes) – additional vocals
Toya (of People's Army) – additional vocals
Divine (of People's Army) – additional vocals
Umi – additional vocals
Becca Byram – additional vocals, keyboards
Abiodun Oyewole (of The Last Poets) – additional vocals
Prodigy (of Mobb Deep) – additional vocals
Dedan (of Illegal Tendencies) – additional vocals
Nimrod (of Illegal Tendencies) – additional vocals
True Image – additional vocals
Mark Batson – keyboards
Christos Tsantilios – recording, mixing
Blair Wells – recording
Nastee – recording
Doug Wilson – mixing
Bernard Grubman – guitar
Pressure of Fambase – keyboards
Melvin Gibbs – bass
Laura J. Seaton-Finn – strings
Joshua – horns
Mista Sinista (of The X-Ecutioners) – scratching
Sean Cane – drums, executive producer
Matt Life – executive producer
Schott Free – executive producer
Stuart "Kamau" Lyle – cover concept
Kerry DeBruce – art direction, design
Lorraine West – illustration
Anthony Cutajar – album photography
Saba – road photography
Corbis – archival images

Charts

Album

Singles

References

Dead Prez albums
Loud Records albums
2000 debut albums
Albums produced by Kanye West
Political music albums by American artists